The 2008 Caribbean Football Union Youth Cup was played from July 31 - August 10 in Trinidad & Tobago. It was part of the 2009 CONCACAF U-17 Championship qualification. Cuba beat Trinidad and Tobago in the final, thus both qualified for the 2009 CONCACAF U-17 Championship.

Format

Groups

Group A

Group B

Group C

Group D

Group E

Group F

Playoff
Bermuda won the play-off after penalties and advanced to the knockout-round.

Knockout stage

References

External links
Tournament at soccerway.com

Youth Cup
2008
CFU
2009 CONCACAF U-17 Championship